Ronaldo Camargo Ribeiro Senfft (born 12 July 1954) is a Brazilian sailor. He won the Silver medal in the Soling class at the 1984 Summer Olympics in Los Angeles along with Daniel Adler and Torben Grael.

References

External links
 
 
 

1954 births
Living people
Brazilian male sailors (sport)
Olympic sailors of Brazil
Olympic silver medalists for Brazil
Olympic medalists in sailing
Sailors at the 1984 Summer Olympics – Soling
Medalists at the 1984 Summer Olympics
North American Champions Soling
South American Champions Soling